Melancholic Autumn (Italian:Malinconico autunno) is a 1958 Italian-Spanish melodrama film directed by Raffaello Matarazzo and starring Amedeo Nazzari, Yvonne Sanson and Mercedes Monterrey. It was part of a popular series of romantic dramas pairing Nazzari and Sanson. The film's sets were designed by the art director Sigfrido Burmann.

Cast
 Amedeo Nazzari as Andrea, capitano del mercantile  
 Yvonne Sanson as María Martínez  
 Mercedes Monterrey as Lola  
 José Guardiola as Giacomo  
 Miguel Gil as Luca Martínez 
 Manuel Guitián
 Vicente Soler
 Miguel Ángel Rodríguez as Il direttore della scuola di Luca 
 Javier Dasti 
 Ángel Calero
 Mariano Alcón
 María de las Rivas as Olga  
 Stanislaw Domolaski
 Joaquín Vidriales
 María Alcarria
 Alfredo Broow
 Eugenio Chemelal 
 Aurora de Alba 
 Alfonso Godá 
 Mario Umberto Martinelli 
 Antonio Martín 
 Mario Moreno

References

Bibliography 
 Moliterno, Gino. The A to Z of Italian Cinema. Scarecrow Press, 2009.

External links 
 

1958 films
1958 drama films
Spanish drama films
Italian drama films
1950s Italian-language films
Films directed by Raffaello Matarazzo
Films scored by Juan Quintero Muñoz
1950s Italian films